Sacramento Bight is an open bight, 2.5 miles (4.0 km) wide, between Calf Head and Cape Harcourt on the north coast of South Georgia. The name "Pinguin-Bay" was given by the German group of the International Polar Year Investigations, 1882–83, to a small bay within the bight now described. The SGS, 1951–52, reported that a name is not necessary for this bay, and that the bight, which is known to whalers and sealers as Sacramento Bay, does require a name. In order to indicate the correct nature of the feature, and at the same time to conform to local usage, the name Sacramento Bight is approved.

Bays of South Georgia
Bights (geography)